Vladimir Mudrinić (born 26 July 1976) is a Serbian football manager and former player.

Mudrinić, who played for five clubs in the UEFA Europa League/UEFA Cup (including qualifiers), is best known for his spells at Smederevo (formerly Sartid) and also his ability to score goals from long range, including being a free-kick specialist.

Playing career
Mudrinić made his senior debut with his hometown's OFK Kikinda in the second part of the 1992–93 First League of FR Yugoslavia, aged 16. He spent the next four years with the club, playing alongside future national team players Mladen Krstajić and Dragan Žilić, before transferring to Vojvodina in the winter of 1997. Mudrinić stayed there for three years, reaching the 1998 UEFA Intertoto Cup final. He then moved to Sartid Smederevo in the winter of 2000, together with his teammates Milorad Mrdak and Boris Vasković.

While with the Oklopnici, Mudrinić became one of the best players in the league, securing him a transfer to Russian club Zenit Saint Petersburg in January 2002.  He made nine league appearances and scored one goal for the side during the 2002 season. In the winter of 2003, Mudrinić returned to Sartid Smederevo, helping the team win the 2002–03 Serbia and Montenegro Cup. He also played for the club in the 2003–04 season.

In October 2004, Mudrinić signed a contract with Red Star Belgrade. He collected the double in the 2005–06 season under the guidance of Walter Zenga. Over the next two seasons, Mudrinić played on loan at his former club Smederevo, before leaving them following their relegation from the top flight in 2008.

Managerial career
Immediately after hanging up his boots, Mudrinić was appointed as manager of Zlatibor Čajetina. He was replaced by Predrag Ristanović in January 2018. Later that year, Mudrinić took charge of Drina Ljubovija.

Career statistics

Honours
Sartid Smederevo
 Serbia and Montenegro Cup: 2002–03
Red Star Belgrade
 First League of Serbia and Montenegro: 2005–06
 Serbia and Montenegro Cup: 2005–06
Jedinstvo Užice
 Drina Zone League: 2010–11
 Serbian League West: 2011–12
Zlatibor Čajetina
 Zlatibor District League: 2013–14
 Drina Zone League: 2015–16

References

External links
 
 
 

Association football midfielders
Expatriate footballers in Russia
FC Zenit Saint Petersburg players
First League of Serbia and Montenegro players
FK Jedinstvo Užice players
FK Sevojno players
FK Smederevo players
FK Vojvodina players
FK Zlatibor Čajetina players
OFK Kikinda players
Red Star Belgrade footballers
RFK Novi Sad 1921 players
Russian Premier League players
Second League of Serbia and Montenegro players
Serbia and Montenegro expatriate footballers
Serbia and Montenegro expatriate sportspeople in Russia
Serbia and Montenegro footballers
Serbian First League players
Serbian football managers
Serbian footballers
Serbian SuperLiga players
Sportspeople from Kikinda
1976 births
Living people